The 1975 XI FIBA International Christmas Tournament "Trofeo Raimundo Saporta" was the 11th edition of the FIBA International Christmas Tournament. It took place at Sports City of Real Madrid Pavilion, Madrid, Spain, on 24, 25 and 26 December 1975 with the participations of Real Madrid (runners-up of the 1974–75 FIBA European Champions Cup), Palmeiras, Arizona State Sun Devils and Estudiantes Monteverde.

League stage

Day 1, December 24, 1975

|}

Day 2, December 25, 1975

|}

Day 3, December 26, 1975

|}

Final standings

References

1975–76 in European basketball
1975–76 in Spanish basketball